The Wet Ink/CAL Short Story Prize, formally known as the Wet Ink Short Story Prize, was an annual literary award given by the magazine Wet Ink for Australian short fiction. Only Australians are eligible for the award. The Wet Ink Short Story Prize was first awarded in 2011 for works written during 2010. The award was discontinued following the closure of Wet Ink with 2012 being the final year the prize was awarded.

History
In March 2010 the Australian magazine Wet Ink announced the creation of the Wet Ink Short Story Prize to mark their five years of publication.

The 2010 prize was open for entries until August 31, 2010. Entries must have met certain criteria including having been written by a writer who is living in Australia, the story must have never been previously published nor be under consideration by a publisher, magazine or for any other prize. The short story doesn't have to follow any set style or theme but must be 5000 words or less. The 2010 prize was judged by Wet Ink's fiction editors Sally Breen and Emmett Stinson, and guest judge Peter Goldsworthy. The winner was announced in January 2011. "The Development Drip" by David Jagger won first prize  of $3000, a year's subscription to Wet Ink, as well as the story being published in the March 2011 issue of Wet Ink. Two highly commended entries received a prize of $200, publication in the March 2011 issue, and a year's subscription to the magazine. Mike Ladd's "Ken" and Sam Twyford-Moore's "Everything We Did in a Different Order" were the two highly commended entries of the 2010 prize. All shortlisted entries received $150, publication in the 'Shortlist issue' [June 2011] of Wet Ink, and a year's subscription to the magazine.

In 2011, after receiving funding from the Copyright Agency Ltd Cultural Fund, Wet Ink renamed the prize 'The Wet Ink/CAL Short Story Prize' and increased the value of its prizes to $3000 First Prize, $1000 each for two Highly Commended entries, and $250 for each shortlisted entry. In addition, each of these entrants will be published in Wet Ink and receive a year's subscription to the magazine.

In 2011, the Wet Ink/CAL Short Story Prize will be judged by Wet Ink's fiction editors Sally Breen and David Sornig, and guest judge Brian Castro. The 2011 prize was won by Sarah Klenbort for her work "Sale Victoria" while J Anne de Staic and James Klousia received the two high commendations.

Wet Ink closed in late 2012. Despite this, the Short Story Prize for 2012 was published online at www.wetink.com.au in April 2013, and prizes were awarded and paid. The Wet Ink website was maintained until June 2013 with details of the winners and the shortlist. The winner of the Wet Ink/CAL Short Story Prize was Claire Aman with two runners-up, Rebekah Clarkson and James Halford.

Winners and nominees
In the following table, the years correspond to the year of the story's eligibility; the ceremonies are always held the following year. Each year links to the corresponding "year in literature" article. Entries with a blue background have won the award; those with a white background are the nominees on the short-list.

 Winners and joint winners
 Commendations
 Runners-up
 Nominees on the shortlist

References

External links
Wet Ink official site

Awards established in 2010
Australian fiction awards
Short story awards